The 1941 Iowa Hawkeyes football team was an American football team that represented the University of Iowa in the 1941 Big Ten Conference football season. In their third season under head coach Eddie Anderson, the Hawkeyes compiled a 3–5 record (2–4 against conference opponents) and were outscored by a total of 99 to 91. The team played its home games at Iowa Stadium in Iowa City.

Schedule

References

Iowa
Iowa Hawkeyes football seasons
Iowa Hawkeyes football